Appeasing Hitler: Chamberlain, Churchill and the Road to War, is a 2019 book by Tim Bouverie about the British policy of appeasement of Hitler in the 1930s.

Bouverie explains the policy as a product of the British response to the First World War.  Given that an enormous percentage of   Britain's fighting-age men had died in a war the purpose of which no one could perceive, Bouverie describes British pacifism as the explanation of Chamberlain's appeasement policy, since "The desire to avoid a Second World War was perhaps the most understandable and universal wish in history."  Bouverie describes the antisemitism of the British ruling class as the secondary cause of Britain's reluctance to stand up to Hitler.

The book is a strong response to a number of recent works of historical revisionism that have painted Chamberlain as a "super-pragmatist", much maligned in view of the fact that his options were limited by widespread popular pacifism and also painting him as a man who cleverly used appeasement to gain time that would enable Britain to rearm.

References

2019 non-fiction books
History books
World War II
Debut books
British non-fiction books
The Bodley Head books
Books about Adolf Hitler